Pat Liddy (Irish: Pádraig Ó Lideadha, born 1944 in Dublin) is an Irish artist, historian, writer, illustrator, broadcaster, mapmaker, and environmental lobbyist. The author and illustrator of over seven books on the city, as well as others on Irish cultural sites, he is the walking tour operator of Pat Liddy's Walking Tours of Dublin.

Early life and education 
He grew up in the inner north city suburb of Phibsborough, the only child of Brendan (born St Peter's Road, Phibsborough) and Maureen (née Mac Mahon) from Kilmainhamwood, County Meath. He was fortunate to have as a playground the semi-rural surrounds of the Royal Canal, the nearby Botanical Gardens and the Victorian urban landscape which helped to fuel his artistic imagination and love of history.  He was educated at St. Vincent's CBS, Glasnevin.

Always interested in art, Pat Liddy entered and won several art competitions as a teenager and young adult. One such endeavour, a balsa wood model of his imaginary concept for a then proposed Roman Catholic cathedral in Dublin, is today on view in the Tara's Palace Museum of Childhood in Powerscourt House in Co. Wicklow.

Early career 

Liddy had initially wanted to be an architect but disliked the way architecture was developing in the early 1960s, especially in his native Dublin, and decided instead to join the national airline, Aer Lingus, in April 1963. In this capacity, he took the opportunities from discounted travel to travel all over the world. These experiences only reinforced Liddy's growing certainty that Dublin was one of the great but undervalued cities of Europe.

Career 
Using his skills of self-taught architectural draftsmanship and general artistic ability, Liddy started to paint and draw scenes from the urban landscape in an attempt to bring attention to the uniqueness and charm of Dublin before those places disappeared forever. The 1970s was a time when a good deal of second-rate redevelopment was clearing away much of the run-down but historic fabric of the city in the name of progress.

Starting in 1982 and running until 1989, Liddy’s weekly column in The Irish Times, called "Dublin Today," featured a pen and ink sketch of a building or place of interest in the city and was accompanied by a description of around 400 words. This long-running series gained a huge following and played an important part in a newfound determination among ordinary people, businesses, property owners and Dublin City Council to rediscover and enhance the city.

Liddy's first book, Dublin Today, published in 1984, arose directly from The Irish Times series. Several more books followed including the popular flagship book, Dublin Be Proud, published during the Dublin Millennium of 1988. It had the unusual distinction of being a number 1 non-fiction best-seller simultaneously in paperback and hardcover.

When the famous Irish traditional music group, The Chieftains, went on a ground-breaking trip to China in 1983 and held many concerts there, Liddy accompanied them and wrote articles on the visit for The Irish Times and The Cork Examiner and on his return held an exhibition of watercolours based on the trip in the renowned Chester Beatty Library. In 1988, on behalf of the Irish American Cultural Institute and Aer Lingus, he undertook 22-city tour of the US promoting Dublin's historical and cultural attractions.

Taking early retirement from Aer Lingus in 1994 he turned his attention full-time to painting, drawing, exploring and writing about the historic buildings, scenic places and exciting new developments in his native city. He combined these skills with his active promotion, both at home and abroad, for the appreciation and protection of what he believed was the unique cultural and architectural heritage of Dublin. He featured in many TV programmes and series, among others a popular 2009 RTÉ One series On the Street Where You Live.

In the early 1990s Liddy was a member of a group that researched and successfully lobbied the Irish government for the introduction of a light rail system into Dublin, now known as the Luas. One offshoot from his local historical knowledge was the invitation on several occasions to name streets and roads in new housing developments.

The most widely distributed tourist map of Dublin, "The Dublin Visitor Map" (13 million copies to date), was designed by Liddy in 1999 (in conjunction with the Dublin City Business Association) and is annually updated by him.

Turning his hand to sculptural design, Liddy designed the Mass Rock Memorial in the village of Lyre, County Cork in 2000 (Mass rocks were substitute altars in rural Ireland during times when the Roman Catholic Church and its services were banned by the authorities from the 16th to the 18th centuries). The annual Dublin Moon Walk, a mid-summer all-night walk fundraiser, with a different route each year, is designed by Liddy in association with the Diabetes Association of Ireland. In 2004, special editions of his book, Dublin A Celebration, were adopted as gifts from the Irish Government to the heads of state and senior ministers of the other European Union's countries to celebrate the accession of the new states in 2004.

Founded in 2005, Pat Liddy's Walking Tours of Dublin, is now one of the city's largest multilingual walking tour guiding companies with a group of professional dedicated guides. The walks he designed show the highlights and hidden gems of Dublin city. Since 2008 Liddy has also led an annual series of free cultural walks around Dublin organised by the Dublin City Council: Hundreds of people participate in each walk.

In May 2011, Liddy received the Lord Mayor's Award in recognition of his dedication to raising awareness of Dublin's architectural and cultural heritage. In the same year, he had the honour of introducing some of Dublin educational and charity organisation dignitaries to Queen Elizabeth II of the United Kingdom during her historic visit to Ireland.

Awards and distinctions 
 Winner (model section) Caltex Art Competition 1961 and 1962 
 Honorary citizen, San Jose, California, 1988 
 Co-leader of the St Patrick's Day parade, St. Louis, Missouri, 1988 
 Ford Cultural Award, 1991 
 The Irish Times Living Dublin Award, 2006 
 Category winner in the Digital Media Ireland Awards, 2008
 Dublin Lord Mayor’s Award, 2011

Personal life
He still lives on the north side in the suburb of Artane. One of his main interests is in early music and in the late '90s and early '00s was a part-time manager of the music group the Capriol Consort, under director Professor Doris Keogh. Liddy was married in 1976 to Josephine Murphy (born Lyre, County Cork) and has three children: Anne Marie, Pádraig and Brendan; and two grandchildren: Rosemary and Senan.

Publications (text and illustrations) 
 Weekly column in The Irish Times, 1982–1989
 Album cover photographs of The Chieftains in China, 1985
 Dublin Today, 1985
 Dublin be Proud, 1987
 Dublin Stolen From Time, 1990
 50 Years A Growin': The Story of Maryfield College, 1995
 Walking Dublin, 1998 & 2000
 Dublin A Celebration, 2000
 Secret Dublin, 2001
 "The Story of Coolock Artane Credit Union," 2001
 Ongar, In the Ancient Barony of Castleknock, 2001
 The Changing Landscapes of Dublin, 2003
 "Serving Our Community 1965–2005, Coolock Artane Credit Union," 2005

Electronic media 
 Newstalk radio series Hidden Dublin
 Various RTÉ documentaries and current affairs programmes
 Regular interviews on national and regional radio stations
 Tourist documentaries on radio and TV for overseas companies from Canada, the US, South Korea, the UK, Germany, Netherlands, Australia, France, Norway, Spain and Israel among others.
 Dublin Tourism Podcast I-Walks 2009
 Fáilte Ireland Podcast I-Walks 2013

Exhibitions 
 Watercolours & Photographs of China, Chester Beatty Library, 1983
 Dublin in Drawings & Watercolours, Arnott's Department Store Gallery, 1984 & 1988
 UBS Gallery, Zurich, The Dublin & Zurich Homes of James Joyce, 1989
 Dublin in paintings, Brussels, 1989
 Malton to Liddy, Dublin Civic Museum, 1991 (collection now held in the Dublin City Council archives)
 The Castles of Dublin & Its Pale, Bank of Ireland Art Centre, 2005
 The Changing Landscapes of Dublin, Dublin City Hall, 2004

References

External links 
 Pat Liddy's Walking Tours of Dublin
 

1944 births
Living people
Writers from Dublin (city)
Businesspeople from Dublin (city)
People educated at St. Vincent's C.B.S., Glasnevin